The Aqua Tepula is an ancient Roman aqueduct completed in 125 BC by censors Gnaeus Servilius Caepio, who had served as consul in 141 BC, and Lucius Cassius Longinus Ravilla.

The water from the Aqua Tepula was, as implied in the name, lukewarm at 16–17 °C at the springs and perhaps due to the sulphurous content was, as Frontinus states, originally not fit for human consumption.

The original daily flow was very low and barely reached 190 quinariae (about 8000 m3 per day).

Route

Its source was at the volcanic area of the Alban hills on the estate of Lucullus, between today's municipalities of Grottaferrata and Marino, a mere 18 km from Rome.

Until the Augustan era the aqueduct flowed along an underground route from source to terminus.

In 33 BC, Agrippa modified the aqueduct concurrently with the construction of the Aqua Julia and added 92 quinariae of water flow from the Julia. The conduit was made to join the newly built one for Julia until it reached the current locality of Capannelle near the Aqua Marcia where there was a limaria pool (settling basin) and by which time the water had cooled.

The water was then split again (for an unexplained reason) into two conduits for the Tepula and the Julia, the Tepula being the highest, superimposed on arches of the Marcia, for the remaining 10 km. They reached the city at ad spem veterem, near Porta Maggiore.

From here on the conduit used the Aurelian Walls and crossed Via Tiburtina on an arch which became Porta Tiburtina. The route passed the Viminal gate, where Termini Station stands today, and ended near the Porta Collina, where the main distribution castellum was, near the current Via XX Settembre. It passed through 14 castella divisorum delivering water to four regions.

Later another 163 quinariae of water, derived from the future Anio Novus aqueduct (built around 50 AD), were added at the horti Epaphroditiani on the Esquiline hill for a final overall total, upon distribution, of 445 (190+92+163) quinariae (18,467 m3, about 200 litres per second), still a scant amount in Roman times.

See also 
 Ancient Roman technology
 List of aqueducts in the city of Rome
 List of aqueducts in the Roman Empire
 List of Roman aqueducts by date
 Parco degli Acquedotti
 Roman engineering

References
Citations

Sources
 
 Frontinus, De Aquis

External links

 The Roman Aqueducts

Tepula